Del Granado is a Spanish surname. Notable people with the surname include:

Javier del Granado (1913–1996), Bolivian poet
Juan del Granado (born 1953), Bolivian lawyer and politician
Santiago Maria del Granado (1757–1823), Spanish physician

Spanish-language surnames